Designer and artist Jessie Stanley is based in Melbourne, Australia. She had an internship at Fabrica in Italy after earning her Bachelor of Visual Communication degree with First Class Honors from Monash University in 2001. In 2003, she founded her own studio, "Foundry." Although her work has been recognised and honoured, I still think of her as a forgotten design super hero. Her name deserves to be associated with excellent Australian design.

.Although relatively invisible outside of Australia, Stanley's online presence has been increased through the publishing of her portrait, short biography, gallery of her work and videoed interview on afFEMation.com where her high engagement and influence on the networks in contemporary Australian graphic design is illustrated through a sociogram.

Early career 

As a graphic design graduate from Monash University (2001) and inspired by the First Things First 1964 manifesto, Stanley travelled from Australia to Europe to intern at Fabrica, in Italy, and Studio Dumbar, in the Netherlands (2002). On her return to Melbourne, Stanley established her studio called Foundry, (2003). The craftsmanship and tactility displayed in her early work like the 'Measurement' project, a series of printed measuring tools, won prestigious awards including the local Premiers Design Mark (2008) and the international Type Directors Club Certificate of Typographic Excellence (2009).

Biography 

Stanley has lectured in the Bachelor of Visual Communication at both Monash University (2003–2004) and Swinburne University (2004–2007) in Melbourne, Australia. Since 2014, she has worked under her own name as a visual artist, whose public installations and exhibitions have been highly influenced by her background in graphic design and her desire to, "redefine the role of graphic design..."

As part of exploring the conceptual abilities of graphic design, Stanley progressed from traditional print media to three-dimensional works, including a public installation called 'The Distance Between You and Me' (2015), which focused on highlighting the importance of local histories and engaging local communities. Stanley had ancestors buried in Vaughan cemetery where she placed the works that included over 2,000 oragami flowers.

Her most recent work has begun exploring spaces through projected light and interactive elements. In 2017, 'Spectrum' featured in an RMIT sponsored projection at Melbourne's White Night festival and used light and colour to show the opposing forces in the world. In 2018, her kinetic work, titled 'HUMAN / NATURE' (2018), which was created during her 'Artist in Residency' in City of Moreland, narrated the history of Kyneton Botanic Gardens.

Awards 

 Besen Emerging Artist Mentorship with Melbourne Fringe Festival (2016)
 Artist in Residence, MoreArts Festival, City of Moreland (2016)
 Banyule Award, Works On Paper, Finalist 2015 Hidden: Rookwood Cemetery Sculpture Park Walk, Commended Artist (2016)
 QANTM Create Design Award, Finalist: Print, Creative (2011)
 Modern Craftsmen Commission at Pin-up Gallery, Honourable mention (2011)
 Type Directors Club, New York, Certificate of Typographic Excellence (2009)
 Premiers Design Awards, Premiers Design Mark (2008)
 Fox River Paper Outstanding Design Awards, First place (2007)
 Australian Graphic Design Association, Distinction Award (2006)
 Australian Graphic Design Association, Distinction Award (2004)
 State Of Design Awards, Finalist (2004)
 Type Directors Club, New York, Certificate of Typographic Excellence (2004)

Solo exhibitions 

 The Distance Between You And Me, series of site specific installations in the Township of Vaughan, Victoria, Castlemaine State Festival (2015)
 Everything Is From Nothing (Exploring the Big Bang), Stockroom Gallery, Kyneton (2011)
 Today Tomorrow, State of Design Festival at Found by Foundry, Daylesford (2009)
 Just One Person And Look At All You Have Done, Street installation, Prahran (2004)
 Broadcast, Kraznapolsky Gallery, St Kilda (2001)

Group Exhibitions 

 2015 (current) THE VIEW FROM HERE, Anita Traverso Gallery, Richmond 
 2011 YOU ARE HERE, Stockroom Gallery, Kyneton 
 2011 MODERN CRAFTSMEN COMMISSION, Pin-up Gallery, Collingwood 
 2009 TYPE DIRECTORS CLUB AWARDS EXHIBITION, United States, Canada, Europe, & Japan 
 2008 PREMIERS DESIGN AWARDS, Melbourne Museum 
 2007 FOX RIVER PAPER OUTSTANDING DESIGN AWARDS EXHIBITION, United States & Europe 
 2004 STATE OF DESIGN, Melbourne Museum 
 2004 TYPE DIRECTORS CLUB AWARDS EXHIBITION, United States, Canada, Europe, & Japan

Publications 

 ABC Open, Family History Inspires Art in Vaughan, (21 March 2015).
 Ish Magazine Singapore (March 2009), designer profile.
 The Age (July 24, 2009), designer profile, The Arts.
 Green magazine, Issue 12, pp32–39, feature article.
 Wallpaper* (December 2008), product editorial.
 Page magazine, Germany. Issue 05.04, (May 2004), pp52–58 feature article.
 The Melbourne Design Guide (2009), Alphabet Press, pp150–151, studio profile.
 Kent Wilson, 2011, Generation, Capture, Release: Fairweather and Robbins, 27/9/11.
 Monument magazine Issue 62 (August/September 2004), pp76–77 studio profile.

References 

Australian graphic designers
Australian typographers and type designers
Year of birth missing (living people)
Living people